Airdlin is a suburb in the north of Sandton in the Gauteng province of South Africa.

References

Johannesburg Region A